Calvary Hospital, originally Lewisham Hospital, is a private hospital founded by Sisters of the Little Company of Mary in 1926 and built to a design by architect William Monks. It is located in Wagga Wagga, New South Wales, Australia.

References

Hospital buildings completed in 1926
Wagga Wagga
Catholic hospitals in Oceania
Hospitals in New South Wales
Hospitals established in 1926
1926 establishments in Australia